Daniel Kyle Morrison (born 3 February 1966) is a New Zealand cricket commentator and former cricketer. He specialised as a pace bowler with a useful outswinger. He made his test debut for New Zealand in 1987 at the age of 21 against Australia.

International career
His most notable bowling accomplishment occurred on 25 March 1994, when he took a hat-trick in a One Day International (ODI) against India. He is one of only three New Zealanders and twenty-two players worldwide to have taken an ODI hat-trick. 

On 28 January 1997, Morrison made his final appearance for his national team, and contributed 14 runs in a 106-run partnership with Nathan Astle for the tenth wicket against England, to save the match. He was dropped from the team after the match.

During his international career, Morrison played for New Zealand in three Cricket World Cups - 1987, 1992 and 1996.

After cricket
Since his departure from international cricket, Morrison has been employed in numerous cricket-related positions. These include:
 Commentator on TVNZ, Sky Sports and Fox Sports
 Commentator on the Indian Premier League
 Commentator on the Bangladesh Premier League
 Commentator on the Pakistan Super League
 Commentator on the Caribbean Premier League
 Host of Sky Sports "Cricket Company" show for 7 years
 Host of radio show on Radio Sport for 6 years
 Charity work including the 'Fight for Life' – Meningitis appeal
 Involved in coaching for schools and clubs
 Guest speaker
 Batter/Bowler for the official New Zealand Beach Cricket team in 2008 and 2009

Personal life
Morrison currently lives on the Sunshine Coast, Australia, moving there in 2006 with his wife, Kim Morrison and children, Jacob and Tayla.

Autobiography
Morrison released an autobiography after his retirement named Mad As I Wanna Be that was published in 1997. This received generally positive reviews although outspoken New Zealand Cricket commentator Richard Whiting described the overall tone of the book as 'mental'. He has also written a book called the Danny Morrison Junior Cricket Diary as an aid for aspiring young cricketers.

References

External links 
 
 

1966 births
Living people
Auckland cricketers
Lancashire cricketers
New Zealand One Day International cricketers
One Day International hat-trick takers
New Zealand Test cricketers
New Zealand cricketers
New Zealand cricket commentators
New Zealand emigrants to Australia
People from the Sunshine Coast, Queensland
Scarborough Festival President's XI cricketers